Ganti (International title: Vengeance of the Heart / ) is a 2005 Philippine television drama series broadcast by GMA Network. The series is the second installment of Now and Forever. Directed by Mac Alejandre, it stars Sheryl Cruz, Nadine Samonte and Cogie Domingo. It premiered on June 13, 2005 replacing Mukha. The series concluded on October 21, 2005 with a total of 95 episodes. It was replaced by Agos in its timeslot.

Cast and characters

Lead cast
 Sheryl Cruz as Samantha
 Nadine Samonte as Marianne
 Cogie Domingo as Javier

Supporting cast
 Zoren Legaspi as Dennis
 Jean Saburit as Eva
 James Blanco as Luis
 Beth Tamayo as Carmela
 Romnick Sarmenta as Henry
 Cris Villanueva as Alfred
 Katrina Halili as Alexa
 Tin Arnaldo as Josephine
 Rainier Castillo as Ricky

Recurring cast
 Noel Trinidad as Manolo
 Roy Alvarez as Gerardo
 Ces Quesada as Ditas
 Jordan Herrera as Nestor
 Valerie Concepcion as Emily
 Eva Darren as Nenita

References

External links
 

2005 Philippine television series debuts
2005 Philippine television series endings
Filipino-language television shows
GMA Network drama series
Television shows set in the Philippines